Gremlin Graphics Software Limited, later Gremlin Interactive Limited and ultimately Infogrames Studios Limited was a British software house based in Sheffield, working mostly in the home computer market. Like many software houses established in the 1980s, their primary market was the 8-bit range of computers such as the ZX Spectrum, Amstrad CPC, MSX, Commodore 16 and Commodore 64. The company was acquired by French video game publisher Infogrames in 1999 and was renamed Infogrames Studios in 2000. Infogrames Studios closed down in 2003.

History 

The company, originally a computer store called Just Micro, was established as a software house in 1984 with the name Gremlin Graphics Software Ltd by Ian Stewart and Kevin Norburn with US Gold's Geoff Brown owning 75% of the company until mid-1989. Gremlin's early success was based on games such as Wanted: Monty Mole for the ZX Spectrum and Thing on a Spring for the Commodore 64. 

In 1994, it was renamed as Gremlin Interactive, now concentrating on the 16-bit, PC and console market. Gremlin enjoyed major success with the Zool and Premier Manager series in the early 1990s, and then with Actua Soccer, the first football game in full 3D; other successful games included the Lotus racing series; a futuristic racing game, Motorhead; a stunt car racing game, Fatal Racing (1995); and the 1998 flight simulator Hardwar. Following EA's success with the EA Sports brand, Gremlin also released their own sports videogame series, adding Golf, Tennis and Ice Hockey to their Actua Sports series. During this time, they used a motif from the Siegfried Funeral March from Götterdämmerung as introductory music.

The company was floated on the stock market to raise funds.

In 1997, Gremlin acquired Imagitec Design and DMA Design (creators of Grand Theft Auto and Lemmings). In 1999, they themselves were bought by Infogrames for around £24 million  and renamed "Infogrames Sheffield House". Infogrames closed the studio in 2003. The building they latterly occupied near Devonshire Green has since been demolished when Infogrames Sheffield House was supposed to be renamed "Atari Sheffield House". In October 2003, Zoo Digital, the successor company to Gremlin, purchased the company's assets from the now-named Atari.

Following the administration of Zoo Digital (later renamed Zushi Games), Gremlin Interactive's catalogue and name were bought up by Ian Stewart's new company Urbanscan.

The Gremlin trademarks (including the g Gremlin logo) are now owned by Warner Bros Entertainment.

Key staff 
Gremlin staff had included:

 Kevin Bulmer - Designer/graphics artist
 Jon Harrison - Designer/graphics artist
 Gary Priest - Programmer
 Bill Allen - Programmer
 Richard Stevenson - Programmer
 David Martin - Marketing Director
 Ben Daglish - Outsourced Musician
 Ade Carless - Designer/graphics artist
 Shaun McClure - Graphics artist / Art Resource Manager
 Antony Crowther ('Ratt') - Designer, programmer
 Asad Habib - Lead Tester
 Paul Whitehead - Tester / Designer
 Ian Stewart - Managing director
 Kevin Norburn - Operations director
 Patrick Phelan - Software manager/sound engineer
 Chris Harvey - Lead console programmer
 Wayne Laybourn - Artist
 Chris Shrigley - Designer / Programmer
 Peter Harrap - Programmer
 Chris Kerry - Programmer
 Shaun Hollingworth - Programmer
 MicroProjects Ltd (Jason Perkins, Mark Rogers, Anthony Clarke)

 Richard Hall - Production Manager

Video games

As Gremlin Interactive

Monty Mole series (1984-1990)
Wanted: Monty Mole (1984)
Monty Is Innocent (1985)
Monty on the Run (1985)
Auf Wiedersehen Monty (1987)
Moley Christmas (1987)
Impossamole (1990)
Potty Pigeon (1984)
Bounder (1985)
Re-Bounder (1987)
Grumpy Gumphrey Supersleuth (1985)
Gauntlet (1985)
Gauntlet: The Deeper Dungeons (1987)
Thing on a Spring (1985)
Zone X (1985)
Jack the Nipper (1986)
Jack the Nipper II: In Coconut Capers (1987)
Trailblazer (1986)
Cosmic Causeway: Trailblazer II (1987)
Alternative World Games (1987)
Basil the Great Mouse Detective (1987)
Deflektor (1987)
Gary Lineker's Superstar Soccer (1987)
Technocop (1988)
Motor Massacre (1988)
Dark Fusion (1988)
Mickey Mouse: The Computer Game (1988)
The Muncher (1988)
Axel's Magic Hammer (1989)
Federation of Free Traders (1989)
H.A.T.E.: Hostile All-Terrain Encounter (1989)
Switchblade (1989)
Switchblade II (1991)
Lotus series (1990-1992)
Lotus Esprit Turbo Challenge (1990)
Lotus Turbo Challenge 2 (1991)
Lotus III: The Ultimate Challenge (1992)
Skidz (1990)Super Cars (1990)Super Cars II (1991)Toyota Celica GT Rally (1990)Venus The Flytrap (1990)HeroQuest (1991)HeroQuest II: Legacy of Sorasil (1994)Spacewrecked: 14 Billion Light Years from Earth (1990)Utopia: The Creation of a Nation (1991)Harlequin (1992)Jeep Jamboree: Off Road Adventure (1992)Nigel Mansell's World Championship Racing (1992)Plan 9 from Outer Space (1992)Premier Manager series (1992-2000)Premier Manager (1992)Premier Manager 2 (1993)Premier Manager 3 (1994)Premier Manager 97 (1996)Premier Manager 98 (1997)Premier Manager: Ninety Nine (1999)Space Crusade (1992)Top Gear (1992)Top Gear 2 (1993)Top Gear 3000 (1995)Zool (1992)Zool 2 (1993)Jungle Strike (1993)Litil Divil (1993)Full Throttle: All-American Racing (1994)K240 (1994)Newman/Haas IndyCar featuring Nigel Mansell (1994)Race Days (1994)Shadow Fighter (1994)Actua Sports series (1995-1999)Actua Soccer (1995)Actua Golf (1996)Actua Soccer 2 (1997)Actua Golf 2 (1998)Actua Ice Hockey (1998)Actua Tennis (1998)Actua Soccer 3 (1998)Actua Pool (1999)Actua Ice Hockey 2 (1999)Actua Golf 3 (1999)UEFA Euro 96 England (1996)Fatal Racing (1995)Loaded (1995)Re-Loaded (1996)Slipstream 5000 (1995)Normality (1996)Hardcore 4X4 (1996)Fragile Allegiance (1996)Realms of the Haunting (1997)Monopoly (1997)Buggy (1998)Motorhead (1998)N2O (1998)Body Harvest (1998)Hardwar (1998)Wild Metal Country (1999)Soulbringer'' (2000)

As Infogrames Sheffield House

See also 
 Sumo Digital: Game developer founded by former members of Gremlin management.
 Martech: Video game publisher founded in the 1980s by David Martin.

References

External links 
 Wayback Archive
 Gremlin Interactive profile from MobyGames

1984 establishments in England
2003 disestablishments in England
Defunct video game companies of the United Kingdom
Video game companies established in 1984
Video game companies disestablished in 2003
Defunct companies based in Sheffield
Video game development companies